A Great Day in Harlem or Harlem 1958 is a black-and-white photograph of 57 jazz musicians in Harlem, New York, taken by freelance photographer Art Kane for Esquire magazine on August 12, 1958. The idea for the photo came from Esquire'''s art director, Robert Benton, rather than Kane. However, after being given the commission, it seems the latter was responsible for choosing the location for the shoot. The subjects are shown at 17 East 126th Street, between Fifth and Madison Avenue, where police had temporarily blocked off traffic. Published as the centrefold of the January 1959 ("Golden Age of Jazz") issue of Esquire, the image was captured with a Hasselblad camera, and earned Kane his first Art Directors Club of New York gold medal for photography. It has been called "the most iconic photograph in jazz history". 

The scene portrayed is something of an anachronism, as by 1957 Harlem was no longer the "hotbed" of jazz it had been in the 1940s, and had "forfeited its place in sun" to 52nd Street in Midtown Manhattan. Many musicians who were formerly resident in the area had already moved to middle class parts of New York, or did so shortly thereafter. Kane himself was not that certain who would turn up on the day, as Esquire staff had merely issued a general invitation through the local musicians' union, recording studios, music writers, and nightclub owners.

In 2018, a book was published to mark the 60th anniversary of the event, with forewards by Quincy Jones and Benny Golson, and an introduction by Kane's son, Jonathan.

Musicians in the photograph

 Red Allen
 Buster Bailey
 Count Basie
 Emmett Berry
 Art Blakey
 Lawrence Brown
 Scoville Browne
 Buck Clayton
 Bill Crump
 Vic Dickenson
 Roy Eldridge
 Art Farmer
 Bud Freeman
 Dizzy Gillespie
 Tyree Glenn
 Benny Golson
 Sonny Greer
 Johnny Griffin
 Gigi Gryce
 Coleman Hawkins
 J.C. Heard
 Jay C. Higginbotham
 Milt Hinton
 Chubby Jackson
 Hilton Jefferson
 Osie Johnson
 Hank Jones
 Jo Jones
 Jimmy Jones
 Taft Jordan
 Max Kaminsky
 Gene Krupa
 Eddie Locke
 Marian McPartland
 Charles Mingus
 Miff Mole
 Thelonious Monk
 Gerry Mulligan
 Oscar Pettiford
 Rudy Powell
 Luckey Roberts
 Sonny Rollins
 Jimmy Rushing
 Pee Wee Russell
 Sahib Shihab
 Horace Silver
 Zutty Singleton
 Stuff Smith
 Rex Stewart
 Maxine Sullivan
 Joe Thomas
 Wilbur Ware
 Dickie Wells
 George Wettling
 Ernie Wilkins
 Mary Lou Williams
 Lester Young

Notable absentees were Louis Armstrong, John Coltrane, and Miles Davis (all touring), Duke Ellington (in Milwaukee), Benny Goodman (in Los Angeles), and Ella Fitzgerald (recording in Chicago). Ruby Braff, Billie Holiday, and Ben Webster were also not present.

Children in the picture
Count Basie, having grown tired of standing, sat down on the curb, and gradually a dozen children followed. Most of the children were neighborhood residents, although the second child from the right, Taft Jordan, Jr., had accompanied his father, Taft Jordan, to the photo session. The photography crew was already having trouble directing the adults, and the presence of the children added to the chaos: one of the children appearing in the window kept yelling at a sibling on the curb; another kept playing with Basie's hat; Taft Jordan, Jr. had been scuffling with the older child seated to his left.  Ultimately, Art Kane realized that any further attempt to organize the proceedings would be futile, and he decided to incorporate the subjects' actions.

Musicians in other photographs

Willie "The Lion" Smith was sitting out of shot at the time the main picture used by Esquire was taken. Ronnie Free, Mose Allison and Charlie Rouse turned up too late for the Esquire picture; Dizzy Gillespie took a photograph of them with Mary Lou Williams, Lester Young and Oscar Pettiford.

Film
Jean Bach, a radio producer of New York, recounted the story behind the photograph in her 1994 documentary film, A Great Day in Harlem. This incorporated 8 mm film footage taken by bassist Milt Hinton on the day of the shoot. The film was nominated in 1995 for an Academy Award for Documentary Feature.
Bach described how, upon the film's release, a number of similar photographs employed the "A Great Day in..." theme. Hugh Hefner assembled Hollywood-area musicians for "A Great Day in Hollywood" in conjunction with a sneak preview of A Great Day in Harlem. Soon after, "A Great Day in Philadelphia" included musicians such as Jimmy Heath, Benny Golson and Ray Bryant. During the filming of Kansas City (1996), musicians including Jay McShann posed for "A Great Day in Kansas City".  A multi-page supplement in The Star-Ledger featured "A Great Day in Jersey", while a Dutch photograph was titled "A Great Day in Haarlem". In 1998, "Great Day in St Paul" was taken by Byron Nelson.

The trend spread to other styles of music, with Houston blues musicians posing for "A Great Day in Houston".  "A Great Day in Hip Hop" was followed by XXL's "The Greatest Day in Hip Hop".  An Atlanta radio station gathered musicians for "A Great Day in Doo-Wop".  A New York cellist, inspired by both the original photograph and the film, assembled chamber musicians for "A Great Day in New York".  The New York Post ran "A Great Day in Spanish Harlem".

The photograph was a key plot point in Steven Spielberg's 2004 film The Terminal.  The film starred Tom Hanks as Viktor Navorski, a character who comes to the United States in search of Benny Golson's autograph, with which he can complete his deceased father's collection of autographs from the musicians pictured in the photo. Golson himself made a cameo appearance in the film.Lorne Graham, "A Great Day in Harlem/The Terminal", NEMC article.

Homages
 1998: "A Great Day in Hip-Hop" — for this photograph by Gordon Parks, commissioned by XXL magazine, 177 hip-hop artists gathered on the stoop of number 17 as well as those of the buildings on either side.Sarah Goodyear, "Stoop Summit — How a Harlem brownstone was immortalized when the living legends of jazz assembled there for an iconic photograph" , New York Daily News, August 12, 2016.
 2004: "A Great Day in London" — in an initiative inspired by Art Kane's photograph, 50 writers of Caribbean, Asian and African descent making a significant contribution to contemporary British literature gathered to be photographed on the steps of the British Museum in London.
 2007: "A Great Day on Eldridge St." - inspired by Kane's photograph, Yale Strom corralled a score of leading klezmer musicians who gathered on the steps of the Eldridge St. Synagogue to commemorate the 30 years of the klezmer revival.
 2008: "A Great Day in Paris" — more than 50 musicians from the US who were then residing in Paris, France, took part in a historic photo session. The project was initiated by Ricky Ford, who has said: "2008 was the 50th anniversary of the photo "A Great Day in Harlem” that Art Kane had taken in 1958 of all those jazz musicians in Harlem. I thought it would be a good idea to do the same thing with the American jazz musicians that lived in France. It took a year to prepare. Musicians from all over France came. Philippe Lévy-Stab took a group photo on the steps of Montmartre and Michka Saäl started to work on a documentary film of those musicians."
 2008: "A Great Day in Hoxton" — a  photograph by Peter Williams, commissioned by Straight No Chaser magazine and featuring prominent music business faces such as Gilles Peterson and James Lavelle alongside designers, fashion professionals, writers, dancers and fellow photographers.
 2013: "Een Grootse Dag in Kootwijk" - in the spirit of XXL's picture "A Great Day in Hiphop", Ghamte Schmidt and Andreas van de Laar gathered the Dutch Hiphopscene at the monumental Radio Kootwijk for a group portrait.
 2016: "A Great Day in Hackney" — in the spirit of Art Kane's photograph, British jazz musicians assembled to celebrate the 30th anniversary of The Premises Studios in Hackney.
 2018: "A Great Day in Hollywood" — 47 black writers, showrunners, actors, and producers from more than 20 Netflix original shows, films and documentaries came together to create "A Great Day in Hollywood". Taken to promote Netflix's Strong Black Lead initiative, Netflix also released a minute long video directed by Lacey Duke and narrated by Caleb McLaughlin (Stranger Things).
 2021: "A Great Day in Roxbury's Highland Park" — Organized by Mark Schafer, Paige Cook, and JD Garcia, with support from the Unitarian Universalist Urban Ministry (UUUM), the Roxbury Historical Society, and Historic Boston, Inc., 77 elders of the historically Black neighborhood of Highland Park in Roxbury, Massachusetts gathered on the stairs of two local brownstone buildings on the morning of November 6, 2021, for a photo that was taken by Roxbury photographer Hakim Raquib. A half-hour documentary on the making of the "A Great Day in Roxbury's Highland Park" photograph, by Bithyah Israel and commissioned by the UUUM,  was premiered at Paige Academy in Roxbury on November 13, 2022.

Notes

References

External links
 Sarah Goodyear, "Stoop Summit — How a Harlem brownstone was immortalized when the living legends of jazz assembled there for an iconic photograph" , New York Daily News'', 12 August 2016 (including interactive photo leading to performance clips by each musician). Retrieved August 29, 2016.

 "Jazz's Most Iconic Photo is Half a Century Old" by Alan Kurtz (Jazz.com)
 Jazz Greats in One Immortal 1958 Image (The New York Times, September 25, 2018)
 An interactive version of A Great Day in Harlem showing the musicians' names

Jazz publications
1958 works
1958 in art
1958 in New York City
Black-and-white photographs
Works originally published in Esquire (magazine)
Photographs of the United States
Harlem
1950s photographs